The Inclusion of the Other is 1996 book by the German philosopher Jürgen Habermas.

Summary
The Inclusion of the Other is a collection of essays, in which Habermas expands on the ideas on law and democracy first articulated in his Between Facts and Norms (1992). Topics include the future of the nation-state, human rights, and deliberative democracy. Also included are two essays Habermas wrote in a series with American political philosopher John Rawls on public reason and the overlapping consensus. Rawls's response is included both with his Collected Papers and the current edition of Political Liberalism (1993).

1996 non-fiction books
Books in political philosophy
German non-fiction books
Works by Jürgen Habermas